Mark Konecny (born April 2, 1963) is a former American football running back. He played for the Miami Dolphins in 1987 and for the Philadelphia Eagles in 1988.

References

1963 births
Living people
Players of American football from Chicago
American football running backs
Alma Scots football players
Miami Dolphins players
Philadelphia Eagles players
National Football League replacement players